George Shum (?1751- 28 February 1805), of 29 Bedford Square, Middlesex and Berry Hill, near Dorking, Surrey, was an English politician.

He was in business with his father in the business of Shum & Son, sugar refiners and also a partner in Gyfford's brewery.

He was a  Whig Member (MP) of the Parliament of Great Britain and the Parliament of the United Kingdom for Honiton
1796 - 28 February 1805.

References

1751 births
1805 deaths
People from Dorking
People from Bloomsbury
Members of the Parliament of Great Britain for Honiton
British MPs 1796–1800
Members of the Parliament of the United Kingdom for Honiton
UK MPs 1801–1802
UK MPs 1802–1806